Sadifa Juma Khamis (born 7 February 1982) is a Tanzanian CCM politician and Member of Parliament for Donge constituency since 2005.

References

1982 births
Living people
Chama Cha Mapinduzi MPs
Tanzanian MPs 2010–2015
Donge Secondary School alumni
Zanzibar University alumni